Castle Rock is an American psychological horror television series, featuring and inspired by characters, settings, and themes from the stories created by Stephen King and his fictional town of Castle Rock, Maine. The series premiered on July 25, 2018, on Hulu. It was created by Sam Shaw and Dustin Thomason, and stars André Holland, Melanie Lynskey, Bill Skarsgård, Jane Levy, and Sissy Spacek in its first season. On August 14, 2018, it was announced that the series had been renewed for a second season starring Lizzy Caplan, Paul Sparks, Barkhad Abdi, Yusra Warsama, Elsie Fisher, Matthew Alan and Tim Robbins, which premiered on October 23, 2019.

In November 2020, Hulu canceled the series after two seasons.

Premise
Castle Rock combines "the mythological scale and intimate character storytelling of King's best-loved works, weaving an epic saga of darkness and light, played out on a few square miles of Maine woodland."

Cast and characters

Main

Season 1
 André Holland as Henry Matthew Deaver, a criminal attorney specializing in capital punishment cases. He left Castle Rock after the townspeople suspected his involvement in his adoptive father's death, but returns upon receiving a strange request. Caleel Harris portrays a young Henry in a recurring role. 
 Melanie Lynskey as Molly Strand, the owner of M. Strand & Associates Real Estate, and a childhood neighbor of Henry's who possesses telepathic and empathic abilities. Cassady McClincy portrays a young Molly in a recurring role. 
 Bill Skarsgård as "The Kid" / "The Angel" (guest star for season 2), an enigmatic inmate at Shawshank State Penitentiary secretly held prisoner by Warden Dale Lacy for 27 years. He specifically asks for Henry after being released from a septic tank located beneath an abandoned cell block in the prison. Skarsgård cameos twice in the second season.
 Jane Levy as Diane "Jackie" Torrance, an aspiring writer who works at M. Strand & Associates Real Estate, and is the niece of Jack Torrance. She possesses a vast knowledge of Castle Rock's history and has taken her uncle's name in order to spite her parents.
 Sissy Spacek as Ruth Deaver, Henry's estranged adoptive mother and a lifelong Castle Rock resident, whose struggle with dementia leads her to reveal secrets about the town's dark past. Ruth later dies sometime before the first season epilogue, and is buried alongside Alan Pangborn. Schuyler Fisk portrays a younger Ruth in a recurring role.

Season 2
 Lizzy Caplan as Annie Wilkes, a mentally ill nurse who gets stuck in Castle Rock.
 Madison Johnson as Young Annie Wilkes
 Ruby Cruz as Teen Annie Wilkes
 Paul Sparks as John "Ace" Merrill, Pop's nephew who stands to take over the family business.
 Max von Schroeter as Teen Ace
 Barkhad Abdi as Abdi Howlwadaag, Nadia's older brother who wants to strengthen Somali ties in their community
 Idiris Yusof as Young Abdi
 Yusra Warsama as Dr. Nadia Howlwadaag, a Somali doctor employed as the medical director at the hospital in Jerusalem's Lot.
 Idil Guled as Young Nadia
 Elsie Fisher as Joy Wilkes (born Evangeline Wilkes), Annie's daughter.
 Colbi Gannett as Young Joy
 Matthew Alan as Chris Merrill, Ace's brother who finds himself stuck between the feud between the Merrills and the Somali community.
 Charlie Tacker as Young Chris
 Tim Robbins as Reginald "Pop" Merrill, the dying head of the Merrill crime family.

Recurring

Season 1 
 Scott Glenn as Alan Pangborn, the retired sheriff of Castle Rock who moves in with Ruth Deaver unbeknownst to her son Henry. Pangborn is accidentally shot by Ruth when she mistakes him for her dead husband. Jeffrey Pierce portrays a younger Alan in a recurring role. 
 Noel Fisher as Dennis Zalewski, a correctional officer at Shawshank who discovers "The Kid" and anonymously calls Henry after hearing "The Kid" say his name. Zalewski begins to go insane and, after discovering that Henry is dropping the Kid's case, guns down numerous prison officers before he is killed by another officer. 
 Frances Conroy as Martha Lacy, the now-widowed wife of Dale Lacy whom Henry visits in an attempt to gain more information about Shawshank. Also guest in season 2. 
 Ann Cusack as Theresa Porter, the new warden of Shawshank and Dale Lacy's successor. Porter covers up The Kid's existence, fearing that she will be the scapegoat. Porter is run over by a prison bus carrying former Shawshank prisoners, after agreeing with Lacy that The Kid is the Devil. 

 Chris Coy as Boyd, a correctional officer at Shawshank who works alongside Dennis. 
 Josh Cooke as Reeves, the deputy warden of Shawshank. 
 Charlie Tahan as Dean Merrill, a teenage drug dealer who supplies Molly with medication. 
 Terry O'Quinn as Dale Lacy, the former warden of Shawshank who commits suicide by decapitation shortly before "The Kid" is discovered. 
 Allison Tolman as Bridget Strand, Molly's sister. 
 Adam Rothenberg as Reverend Matthew Deaver, Henry's late adoptive father and Castle Rock's former pastor. The townspeople labeled Henry as the prime suspect in Rev. Deaver's death. It is revealed that Henry did in fact attempt to kill Matthew, after discovering that Matthew intended to kill Ruth for having an affair with Alan. 
 Aaron Staton as Drew, Castle Rock's pastor and Matthew Deaver's successor at the local Church of the Incarnation. Staton reprises his role in season 2 as a pastor for Pop Merrill, becoming the first character from a previous season to reappear in another. 

 Zabryna Guevara as Maret
 Rory Culkin as Willie, the interpreter, and protégé of Odin Branch.
 Charles Jones as Odin Branch, an old friend of Reverend Matthew Deaver with advanced degrees in bioacoustics and psychoacoustics.
 Chosen Jacobs as Wendell Deaver, Henry's son.
 Mark Harelik as Gordon, a history professor from Des Moines, Iowa who moves to Castle County after attacking a man for sleeping with his wife. Following the move, the couple converts the Lacy home into a bed and breakfast.
 Lauren Bowles as Lilith, wife of Gordon, with whom she newly co-owns the Lacy home.
 Mathilde Dehaye as Amity

Season 2
 John Hoogenakker as  Carl Wilkes, "a man with a complicated connection to [Annie] Wilkes"
 Robin Weigert as Chrysida Wilkes, Annie Wilkes's mom
 Isayas J. Theodros as Jamal
 Chris Mulkey as Clay
 Abby Corrigan as Chance
 Tenea Intriago as Vera
 Aaron Staton as Pastor, who has sided with Ace
 Mathilde Dehaye as Amity, the prophet of New Jerusalem in 17th century
 Faysal Ahmed as Hassan
 Alison Wright as Valerie
 Joy Lang as Councilwoman Pinto
 Kate Avallone as Evelyn
 Sarah Gadon as Rita K. Green, Joy's biological mother and Annie's stepmother

Guest

Season 1
 Phyllis Somerville as Leanne Chambers ("Severance"), one of Henry's clients in Texas who is sentenced to death for murdering her husband Richard. 
 Brionne Davis as Garrett Coyne ("Habeas Corpus") 
 Audrey Moore as Mrs. Strand, Molly's mother. ("Habeas Corpus") 
 Timothy John Smith as Deputy Norris Ridgewick ("Habeas Corpus")
 Burke Moses as Local Color Host ("Local Color"), the host of public access television series Local Color on WEBV, Castle County's community television station. 
 David Selby as Josef Desjardins ("The Box"), a barber and the brother of Vince Desjardins, a convicted felon who was suspected in Henry Deaver's disappearance.
 Richard Schiff as Warden Porter's Superior ("Harvest"), a man to whom Porter reports at Shawshank.
 James LeGros as the Sheriff of Castle Rock ("Harvest")
 Peta Sergeant as Angela ("Harvest")
 Amanda Brooks as Psychologist ("Harvest")
 Jayne Atkinson as Daria Reese ("Past Perfect"), a senior state police officer who knows Henry from when he and her daughter were in high school together.
 Rodrigo Lopresti as Gaddis ("Past Perfect"), the male member of the couple that are Gordon and Lilith's first bed and breakfast guests.

Episodes

Season 1 (2018)

Season 2 (2019)

Production

Development
On February 17, 2017, it was announced that Hulu, J. J. Abrams, and Stephen King were collaborating on a new series entitled Castle Rock, based on King's large canon of work. It was further reported that the series would be written by Sam Shaw and Dustin Thomason, produced by Abrams' Bad Robot Productions, and distributed by Warner Bros. Television. Four days later, Hulu revealed that they had given the production a series order consisting of a first season of ten episodes, and executive producers would include Abrams, King, Shaw, Thomason, Ben Stephenson, and Liz Glotzer. On July 12, 2017, it was announced that Michael Uppendahl was joining the production as a co-executive producer and would direct the pilot episode.

On August 14, 2018, it was announced that Hulu had renewed the series for a second season, which premiered on October 23, 2019.

On November 3, 2020, Hulu canceled the series after two seasons.

Casting
On May 11, 2017, it was announced that André Holland had been cast in the series' lead role. In June 2017, Jane Levy, Sissy Spacek, and Melanie Lynskey had joined the main cast. On July 10, 2017, Bill Skarsgård was set to join the roster. In August 2017, it was reported that Scott Glenn and Terry O'Quinn had been added as series regulars, and on March 1, 2018, it was announced that Chosen Jacobs had joined in the recurring role of Wendell Deaver, the son of Holland's character. On June 8, 2018, it was announced during the annual ATX Television Festival that Allison Tolman will have the recurring role of Lynsky's character's sister, and five days later, it was reported that Noel Fisher was also on board.

In March 2019, it was announced that the season 2 cast would feature Lizzy Caplan, Tim Robbins, Garrett Hedlund, Elsie Fisher, Yusra Warsama, Barkhad Abdi and Matthew Alan in lead roles. Hedlund's role was later recast with Paul Sparks. On April 17, 2019, it was reported that John Hoogenakker had been cast in an undisclosed recurring role for season 2.

Filming
Principal photography for the first season was expected to take place in Massachusetts, in locations such as Orange, Massachusetts, and at New England Studios in Devens, Massachusetts. In August 2017, production began in Devens and in Orange, where the downtown area had been refitted to appear as the town of Castle Rock, and where production was expected to continue through January 2018. That month, crews also shot scenes at Vernon Hill School in Worcester, Massachusetts, and at an old Victorian house in Lancaster, Massachusetts. Filming returned to Orange during the week of August 21 for production of the series' second episode. In late September 2017, filming took place in Tewksbury, Massachusetts, at The Public Health Museum on the campus of the Tewksbury State Hospital. In October 2017, filming took place at the Central Cemetery in Orange where a funeral scene was shot. The downtown area was refitted with a more modern look in November for another phase of production. From September 4, 2017, until the end of the month, production took place at the former West Virginia Penitentiary in Moundsville, West Virginia, which appeared as the fictional Shawshank State Prison. On November 21, 2017, filming took place in Worcester in the lobby of the Mercantile Building, which had been refitted into a boardroom. On December 18, 2017, production for the season finale began. By January, all filming in Orange was completed, and the production proceeded to donate $3,500 to the town. The Fire Department received $2,500 for helping facilitate production, and the Trustees of Soldiers' Memorial was to receive another $1,000.

Visual effects were used to alter seasons, including adding snow to scenes in which there was no snow on location, as well as to create a forest fire in episode five.

In 2019, it was reported that filming for second season would take place at additional Massachusetts locations, including a former meat factory building in Clinton, and several properties in Gardner. Parts of season 2 episode 5 were filmed at a house on Prospect Street in Leominster, MA.

Music
The song "Twenty Four Hours from Tulsa" is used three times during the first season, including the first song heard in the premiere (Gene Pitney's 1963 version) and the last song heard over the closing credits of the finale (Dusty Springfield's 1964 version). It captures the underlying situation of The Kid in the lyrics: "Dearest darling, I had to write to say that I won't be home anymore / 'Cause something happened to me while I was driving home / And I'm not the same anymore".

Release

Premiere
On June 8, 2018, the series took part in the annual ATX Television Festival in Austin, Texas, where a "first look" at footage took place. Following the premiere of the footage, a question-and-answer panel occurred with creators and executive producers Sam Shaw and Dustin Thomason. On June 19, 2018, it was announced that the series would hold its world premiere during the show's panel at San Diego Comic Con in San Diego, California, where cast members including Sissy Spacek, Bill Skarsgård, and Melanie Lynskey were set to be in attendance.

On September 7, 2018, the series took part in the 12th Annual PaleyFest Fall Television Previews, which featured a screening of the first-season finale and a discussion with creator and executive producer Sam Shaw.

Home media
The first season was released by Warner Bros. Home Entertainment on digital platforms on October 15, 2018. It was then released on Blu-ray, 4K UHD Blu-ray and DVD on January 8, 2019. All ten episodes of the season were made available in the set along with exclusive bonus content. The second season was announced to be released on digital platforms on January 21, 2020, and Blu-ray and DVD on May 19. The release was later postponed to July 21.

Reception

Critical response
The first season has been met with a generally positive response from critics. On the review aggregation website Rotten Tomatoes, the first season holds an approval rating of 87% based on 76 reviews, with an average rating of 7.49/10. The website's critical consensus reads, "A meticulously crafted mystery brimming with allusions, Castle Rock is bound to please even the pickiest of Stephen King fans — though mileage may vary for casual viewers." Metacritic assigned the first season a weighted average score of 66 out of 100, based on 35 critics, indicating "generally favorable reviews."

Early reviews for the first season were generally positive. Colliders Dave Trumbore praised the series, saying, "Shaw, Thomason, Abrams & Co. really nail the core concepts of King's storytelling here. Each character gets a good amount of screen time to focus on introspection...Castle Rock  is a can't-miss series for Stephen King fans and a must-watch horror show for fans of dark, thrilling, character-focused mysteries." In a similarly favorable critique, Entertainment Weeklys Kristen Baldwin gave the series a grade of "A−" and commended it, saying, "Though most characters are new (Scott Glenn's Alan Pangborn, a sheriff who appeared in Needful Things and The Dark Half, is one exception), for King fans the world of Castle Rock will be inescapably familiar. Spending time here feels, in many ways, like coming home — with all of the excitement and dread such a visit entails." In another approving criticism, Ben Travers of Indiewire gave the series a grade of "B+" and complimented it, saying, "For a show that could've been dominated by its origins, Castle Rock sure has a good time breathing new life into them. Smart, fun scares; deeply felt, well-founded characters; layers of story to decipher, along with the references — what more could you want in a new piece of the Stephen King library?" In a mixed review, Dan Fienberg of The Hollywood Reporter criticized the series, saying, "The actors will offer the best incentive for the King-ambivalent to tune into Castle Rock, but I'm not sure even they will ultimately be enough to overcome the sluggish and vague story." In a negative review, Daniel D'Addario of Variety was even more disapproving, saying, "It's eerie-by-the-numbers, repeatedly telling us quite how scared we ought to be, without yet building characters for whom we feel sympathetic fear."

Among all first-season episodes, "The Queen" received particular acclaim from critics with praise being directed towards the writing and Spacek's performance. On Rotten Tomatoes, the episode holds a 100% approval rating with an average rating of 9.75 out of 10, based on 14 reviews. The Ringers Miles Surrey referred to the episode as "not only the best episode of the series, but one of the best episodes of television in 2018." Vultures Brian Tallerico awarded the episode a rating of five out of five stars and was similarly enthusiastic, saying, "Television doesn't get much more heartbreaking than "The Queen," a showcase for the legendary Sissy Spacek and one of the best hours of television this year." Aiming commendation at the episode's instrumental score, Birth.Movies.Death.s Jacob Knight wrote, "The music in Castle Rock – courtesy of composer Chris Westlake – has been nothing short of exemplary throughout the entire series, but in "The Queen" it practically becomes a character unto itself."

The second season has been met with a generally positive response from critics. On Rotten Tomatoes, the second season holds an approval rating of 89% based on 35 reviews, with an average rating of 7.77/10. The website's critical consensus reads, "Driven by an unsettlingly compelling Lizzy Caplan, Castle Rocks second chapter opens the borders of its titular town without losing any of its creeping atmosphere." Metacritic assigned the second season a weighted average score of 72 out of 100, based on 8 critics, indicating "generally favorable reviews."

Awards and nominations

See also
 Castle Rock, the fictional town upon which the series is based

References

External links

2010s American drama television series
2010s American horror television series
2010s American science fiction television series
2010s American supernatural television series
2018 American television series debuts
2019 American television series endings
American horror fiction television series
Castle Rock (franchise)
English-language television shows
Hulu original programming
Television shows based on works by Stephen King
Television series by Bad Robot Productions
Television series by Warner Bros. Television Studios
Television shows set in Maine
Television shows filmed in Massachusetts
Television shows filmed in West Virginia
Psychological horror